Piotr Drzewiecki can refer to:

 Piotr Drzewiecki (footballer)
 Piotr Drzewiecki (mayor)